The Serendipitaceae are a family of fungi in the order Sebacinales. Species do not produce visible basidiocarps (fruit bodies), but form septate basidia on thin, trailing hyphae. Species are mycorrhizal, forming associations with a wide range of plants. Most species have only been detected through environmental DNA sampling or laboratory cultures. The family currently contains the single genus Serendipita.

References

Sebacinales
Serendipitaceae